Robert Arthur Hopkins (born 25 October 1961) is an English former professional footballer who played as a winger.

Hopkins was born in the Hall Green district of Birmingham, and started his playing career at Aston Villa his longest club he played for with whom he won the FA Youth Cup in 1980. He played in more than 300 Football League matches for Aston Villa, Birmingham City (in two spells), Manchester City, West Bromwich Albion, Shrewsbury Town and Colchester United. He also played in Hong Kong for Instant-Dict and for non-League clubs Solihull Borough and Bromsgrove Rovers. While at Birmingham, the club he has supported since childhood, he helped the club to win promotion to the First Division in 1985 and the Associate Members' Cup in 1991. He also scored the decisive own goal in an embarrassing FA Cup defeat at home to non-league club Altrincham.

In 2012, Hopkins was one of seven former players elected to Birmingham City's Hall of Fame.

Honours
Aston Villa
 FA Youth Cup: 1979–80
 Southern Junior Floodlit Cup: 1979–80
Birmingham City
 Football League Second Division runners-up: 1984–85
 Associate Members' Cup: 1990–91

Individual
 Birmingham City F.C. Hall of Fame: inducted 2012

References

1961 births
Footballers from Birmingham, West Midlands
Living people
English footballers
Association football wingers
Aston Villa F.C. players
Birmingham City F.C. players
Manchester City F.C. players
West Bromwich Albion F.C. players
Shrewsbury Town F.C. players
Double Flower FA players
Colchester United F.C. players
Solihull Borough F.C. players
Bromsgrove Rovers F.C. players
English Football League players
Hong Kong First Division League players
Expatriate footballers in Hong Kong
English expatriate sportspeople in Hong Kong
English expatriate footballers